Werner Rathmayr (born 26 January 1972) is an Austrian former ski jumper.

Career
He earned six World Cup wins between 1991 and 1992. Rathmayer's best finish at the FIS Ski Flying World Championships was 18th in Harrachov in 1992. Rathmayr did not participate in the 1992 Winter Olympic Games in Albertville, despite being the World Cup leader. He is the only athlete in the history of Ski Jumping World Cup to do so, and one of only two athletes, who were the World Cup leaders during the Olympic Games, but finished without a single medal at the event (the other one is Jakub Janda, who did that in 2006). During one of the training rounds at the 1993 World Ski Championships, Rathmayr suffered a dangerous fall after which he was never able to come back to his form from 1992 and 1993. His best start after the fall was 7th place in Innsbruck in 1994.

World Cup

Standings

Wins

References 

1972 births
Austrian male ski jumpers
Living people
Sportspeople from Linz
20th-century Austrian people